This is a listing of researchers who have made discoveries or inventions relating to the science and technology of underwater diving.
Divers who have become notable due to their exploits are not listed here, unless they have published research findings or invented an important item of diving related equipment. For these, see List of underwater divers.

Researchers and inventors of diving technology

 (1910-1992)

 (1910-1997) Open circuit demand scuba regulator
 (1870–1965)
 

 (1920-2005)
 (1914-2006)

 (1900-1979)
 (1947-)
 (1917-2011)
 

 (1941-)
 

 - Invented the neck dam for diving helmets
 
 

 (1909-1941)
 (1801-1867)

Researchers in diving medicine and physiology, including decompression theory

B

 – Italian decompression researcher.

 (6 Jul 1935 – 4 May 2002) – USAF decompression researcher

 (1903-1992) 
 (12 June 1931 – 9 August 2022)
 
 (1833-1886)

 – 
 (1915-1983)
 
 – 
 
 (1627-1691) Relation between pressure and volume in a gas, and the effects of low ambient pressure on animals.
 (24 January 1941 – 5 April 2022)
 (1923-1994) Bühlmann decompression algorithm

C

D

 – US Navy decompression researcher.

 – American decompression researcher.
 (1911–1994)
 – American decompression researcher.

E
 – Author of diving medicine textbooks

F

 (1917-2008)

 Narcotic effects of oxygen at pressure.

G

 (c2007) – American decompression researcher.
 (4 June 1901 – 17 July 1984)
 – Decompression researcher.

 (1988)

H
 (1860-1936), Haldane's decompression model
 (1930-2011)

 (c1988) – British decompression researcher, combined perfusion/diffusion model of the BSAC'88 tables.
 (1866-1952)
 (1934-2006), Thermodynamic model of decompression

 

 (1825-1895)
 – American decompression researcher

I

 – French decompression researcher.

K

 
, Canadian decompression researcher, Kidd-stubbs decompression model, DCIEM decompression tables
 – Decompression sickness treatment researcher. Hyperbaric treatment schedules#Kindwall's monoplace table 
 – Research on PFO in divers
 – Decompression researcher.

L
 (1917-2011)
 environmental physiologist
 – American decompression researcher. 

, Australian decompression researcher.

Pasquale Longobardi (born 1961) - Italian researcher.

M

 (13 October 1825 – 12 August 1901) 
 (b1958)
 (1896-1967)

N
 
 - Canadian decompression researcher

O

P
 – Decompression researcher

 
 
 - Decompression researcher

 (1962 - )

Q  
 (c1973)

R
 (1922-2011)

S
 (c1906)

 (1901-1994)
 (fl.1873) 

 (c1984) Canadian decompression researcher, Kidd-Stubbs decompressin model, DCIEM decompression tables

T 
 (1945-2004), Thalmann algorithm
 – Decompression researcher

U
 (c1984) Diabetes and diving.

V
 – 
  –

W

  

 – American decompression researcher, Reduced gradient bubble model (RGBM)
 – American decompression researcher. Concept of M-values, US Navy (1965?) decompression tables.

Y
 (c1937) – US Navy decompression researcher. 1937 US Navy tables, Treatment with hyperbaric oxygen.
 – American decompression researcher. Varying Permeability Model

Z
 (1847-1920)

See also

References

Science of underwater diving
History of underwater diving